The Last Viking may refer to:
 The Last Viking (album)
 The Last Viking (film)